Cyperus hamulosus is a sedge of the family Cyperaceae. It is native from Bulgaria east to Mongolia, and from Morocco in northAfrica down to Namibia in the south. It has also been introduced to western parts of Australia.

Description
In Australia it blooms between April and May producing green flowers.

Taxonomy
The was described by the botanist Friedrich August Marschall von Bieberstein in 1808 as a part of the work Flora Taurico Caucasica. There are eight synonyms including; Cyperus aristatus subsp. hamulosus, Dichostylis hamulosa, Isolepis hamulosa, Mariscus hamulosus and Scirpus hamulosus.

Distribution
It is found in temperate climatic areas from Eastern Europe to parts of central Asia. It is also found in tropical parts of West Africa.
It has become naturalised is Western Australia and is found around the edges of lakes in the Mid West, Gascoyne and Goldfields-Esperance regions of Western Australia where it grows in gravelly sandy-clay soils. It is also found in the Northern Territory.

See also
List of Cyperus species

References

Plants described in 1808
hamulosus
Flora of Western Australia
Flora of the Northern Territory
Flora of Morocco
Flora of Namibia
Flora of Botswana
Flora of Chad
Flora of Mali
Flora of Niger
Flora of Nigeria
Flora of Senegal
Flora of Bulgaria
Flora of Greece
Flora of Russia
Flora of Mongolia
Flora of Romania
Flora of Tunisia
Flora of Turkmenistan
Flora of Uzbekistan
Flora of Ukraine